Shirley Russell (born 31 December 1967) is a former Australian rugby union player. She made her test debut for Australia in 1995 against New Zealand in Auckland.

Russell was a flanker in the 1998 Wallaroos side that made their Rugby World Cup debut in the Netherlands. She played her final test against Spain at the tournament in Amsterdam. She won the first-ever Australian Women’s Player of the Year award. She was also part of the first Queensland women’s XV's team.

Russell was an assistant for the Wallaroos at the 2006 Rugby World Cup in Canada. She was also involved with Australia women's sevens team that won the inaugural 2009 Rugby World Cup Sevens tournament in Dubai.

Russell continues to give back to rugby with her coaching, under the banner of the Classic Wallabies and Classic Wallaroos. She is also a Vintage Reds board member.

References 

1967 births
Living people
Australian female rugby union players
Australia women's international rugby union players